The 2014–15 Football League Two was Wycombe Wanderers' 127th season in existence and their 21st season in the Football League. This page shows the statistics of the club's players in the season, and also lists all matches that the club played during the season.

Wycombe improved dramatically following the disappointing previous season and were strong throughout the campaign, constantly occupying one of the three automatic promotion places from September until the end of April.

Despite this, they fell just short in the race for automatic promotion, having to contest in the play-offs instead. Wycombe overcame Plymouth Argyle in the semi-finals, to book their place at Wembley Stadium for the first time in 21 years. In the final, however, Wycombe lost to Southend United in a penalty shoot-out.

League data

League table

Results summary

Results by round

Scores overview
Wycombe Wanderers' score given first.

Match details

Legend

Friendlies

League Two

The fixtures for the 2014–15 season were announced on 18 June 2014.

League Two play-offs

FA Cup

League Cup

Football League Trophy

Squad statistics

Appearances and goals

|-
|colspan="14"|Players who left the club before the end of the season:

|}

Goalscorers

  Paris Cowan-Hall and Josh Scowen left the club before the end of the season.

Disciplinary record

Transfers

In

Out

Loaned in

Loaned out

References

External links
 Official Website

Wycombe Wanderers F.C. seasons
Wycombe Wanderers